Kototsubaki Katsuyuki (born 6 December 1960 as Katsuyuki Tokashiki) is a former sumo wrestler from Naha, Okinawa, Japan. He made his professional debut in March 1976, and reached the top division in January 1991. His highest rank was maegashira 3. His favourite techniques were tsuki/oshi (pushing and thrusting). He retired in March 1995, and became an elder in the Japan Sumo Association under the name Shiratama. He joined the Sumo Association's special executive group, below the 10 directors and 3 deputy directors, on 30 March 2022.

Career record

See also
Glossary of sumo terms
List of past sumo wrestlers
List of sumo elders

References

1960 births
Living people
Japanese sumo wrestlers
Sumo people from Okinawa Prefecture